Banda Kanakalingeswara Rao (20 January 1907 – 3 December 1968) was an Indian actor known for his works in Telugu theatre, and Telugu cinema.
He was the member of Kendriya Sangeet Natak Akademi since 1952 and Andhra Pradesh Sangeet Natak Akademi since 1957.

He promoted Kuchipudi dance along with Vedantam Parvatisam in 1957 helped the government in the establishment of Siddhendra Kalakshetra in Kuchipudi village. This institution was later merged with the Potti Sreeramulu Telugu University in 1989. He wrote many articles to take this art form to the public.
He joined All India Radio in 1956 and broadcast many drama and playlets. He founded Shiva temple and Vedic School in his native village.

He founded College for Theatre arts in Eluru in 1938 and trained many students and art lovers. He established Prabhat Theatre in 1942, an institution and introduced new techniques into the stage plays.
He entered the Telugu film industry during the early period and acted in some films like Paduka Pattabhishekham (1945), Bala Nagamma (1942), Sarangadhara (1937), and Draupadi Manasamrakshanam (1936).

Early life
He was born in 1907 at Atapaka village in Kaikaluru mandal of Krishna district, Andhra Pradesh. After primary education, he joined Noble College, Machilipatnam. He graduated in Law from Madras Law College in 1932. He practiced as a lawyer for some time and later shifted to the theatre field as his profession.  He played many different roles in various dramas. He was well known for the Bahuka in Chitranaleeyam and Bilwamangal in Chintamani.

Personal life
He lost his wife in 1942 and returned to Eluru. He married again. He had seven daughters and a son.

Death
He died in 1968. His statue was built in the Atapaka village.

Awards
He was recipient of Sangeet Natak Akademi Award in 1963.

Filmography
 Paduka Pattabhishekam (1945) ... Bharatha
 Bala Nagamma (1942) ... Kaaryavardhi Raju
 Sarangadhara (1937) ... Sarangadhara
 Draupadi Manasamrakshanam (1936)

References

External links
 

Telugu people
Indian male stage actors
1907 births
1968 deaths
Recipients of the Sangeet Natak Akademi Award
20th-century Indian male actors
Andhra University alumni
Indian male film actors
Male actors from Andhra Pradesh
Male actors in Telugu cinema
Male actors in Telugu theatre
People from Krishna district